Carrie Ann or Carrie-Ann is a blended name combining Carrie and Ann that is an English feminine given name derived from the names Karl and Hannah. Notable people referred to by this name include the following:

Given name
Carrie Ann Baade (born Louisiana), American painter
Carrie Ann Lucas (1971 – 2019), American lawyer, disability rights advocate, and activist

See also

Carrie Anne (name)

Notes

English feminine given names